Edward Grubb may refer to:

 Edward Grubb of Birmingham (1740–1816), English sculptor
 Edward Burd Grubb Jr. (1841–1913), American soldier and diplomat
 Edward Grubb (Quaker) (1854–1939), British Quaker pacifist and hymnist
 Edward Burd Grubb Sr. (1810–1867), American businessman and abolitionist